is a former Japanese football player.

Club statistics

References

External links

jsgoal

1986 births
Living people
Ehime University alumni
Association football people from Ehime Prefecture
Japanese footballers
J2 League players
Fagiano Okayama players
Association football defenders